Crawl Away may refer to:

Entertainment

"Crawl Away", a song by progressive metal band Tool from their 1993 album Undertow
"Crawl Away", a song by Disciple from their 1995 album What Was I Thinking